Denis Gigi Brînzan (born 26 November 1996) is a Romanian professional footballer who plays as a defender for Viitorul Târgu Jiu. Brînzan started his career at Pandurii Târgu Jiu, club of which captain was during the 2018–19 season.

References

External links
 
 

1996 births
Living people
Sportspeople from Târgu Jiu
Romanian footballers
Association football defenders
Liga I players
Liga II players
CS Pandurii Târgu Jiu players
FC Argeș Pitești players
CSM Reșița players
ACS Viitorul Târgu Jiu players